American confederation may refer to:

United States of America (1781-1789), under the Articles of Confederation
Confederate States of America (1861–1865), a secessionist state during the American Civil War